Music albums in the WWE The Music series, formerly the WWF The Music series, include:

WWF Full Metal: The Album, 1995, considered to be Volume 1
WWF The Music, Volume 2 in 1997
WWF The Music, Volume 3 in 1998
WWF The Music, Volume 4 in 1999
WWF The Music, Vol. 5 in 2001
ThemeAddict: WWE The Music, Vol. 6 in 2004
WWE The Music, Volume 7 in 2007
WWE The Music, Volume 8 in 2008
Voices: WWE The Music, Vol. 9 in 2009
WWE The Music: A New Day, Vol. 10 in 2010
WWE The Music: The Beginning, 2012

See also

WWE Music Group

WWE albums